Horčička is a Czech family name. Notable people with the surname include:

Daniel Sinapius-Horčička, Slovak baroque writer
František Horčička (1776–1856), Czech painter
Luboš Horčička (born 1979), Czech ice hockey goaltender

Czech-language surnames